Hope Thompson is a Canadian playwright and screenwriter.

Education 
Thompson graduated from Norman Jewison's Candian Film Centre.

Career 
Thompson's first play, Green, premiered in 2004 at Buddies in Bad Times' Rhubarb! Festival. Including Green, four of Thompson's works would premiere at Rhubarb! Festivals. Her play, Trapped! premiered at the 2014 Rhubarb! Festival under the direction of Morgan Norwich.

Works

Plays 

 Green (2004)
 Hospital Green
 Tyrolia (2008)
 She Walks the Line
 Stiff
 Trapped! (2014)
 The Love Crimes of Frances Lark (2015)
 Dead Money

Filmography

Film

Television

Personal life 
Thompson studied at Mount Allison University (BFA) and at the University of British Columbia (MFA). From 2000-2003, she lived in Pittsburgh with her partner, Simone Jones.

References

External links 

 

Living people
Canadian women dramatists and playwrights
21st-century Canadian dramatists and playwrights
OCAD University alumni
Mount Allison University alumni
Toronto Metropolitan University alumni
Canadian women screenwriters
Canadian lesbian writers
Date of birth missing (living people)
Year of birth missing (living people)
Lesbian screenwriters
21st-century Canadian LGBT people